Norra Fäladen is a city district in Lund, Sweden. Most parts of Norra Fäladen were built during the 1960s and 1970s, when there was an extensive program for building new apartments throughout Sweden, called the Million Programme.

References

Lund
Neighbourhoods in Sweden